This is a list of 1997 Five Nations Championship squads. It includes a list of all of the players in each squad for the Five Nations Championship held in 1997.

England

Head coach: Jack Rowell

 Rob Andrew
 Will Carling
 Mike Catt
 Ben Clarke
 Lawrence Dallaglio
 Phil de Glanville (c)
 Darren Garforth
 Andy Gomarsall
 Paul Grayson
 Phil Greening
 Jeremy Guscott
 Austin Healey
 Richard Hill
 Martin Johnson
 Jason Leonard
 Mark Regan
 Tim Rodber
 Graham Rowntree
 Simon Shaw
 Chris Sheasby
 Jon Sleightholme
 Tim Stimpson
 Tony Underwood

France

Head coach: Jean-Claude Skrela

 Guy Accoceberry
 David Aucagne
 Abdelatif Benazzi (c)
 Philippe Benetton
 Pierre Bondouy
 Christian Califano
 Philippe Carbonneau
 Thomas Castaignède
 Richard Castel
 Marc Dal Maso
 Marc de Rougemont
 Richard Dourthe
 Fabien Galthié
 Stéphane Glas
 Raphaël Ibañez
 Jean-Louis Jordana
 Christophe Lamaison
 Laurent Leflamand
 Olivier Magne
 Olivier Merle
 Hugues Miorin
 Ugo Mola
 Émile Ntamack
 Fabien Pelous
 Alain Penaud
 Jean-Luc Sadourny
 Franck Tournaire
 David Venditti

Ireland

Head coach: Brian Ashton

 Jonny Bell
 Paul Burke
 Shane Byrne
 Allen Clarke
 David Corkery
 Ben Cronin
 Dominic Crotty
 Jeremy Davidson
 Eric Elwood
 Maurice Field
 Paul Flavin
 Anthony Foley
 Gabriel Fulcher
 Denis Hickie
 Niall Hogan
 David Humphreys
 Paddy Johns
 Denis McBride
 Stephen McIvor
 Kurt McQuilkin
 Eric Miller
 Ross Nesdale
 Brian O'Meara
 Conor O'Shea
 Nick Popplewell
 Jim Staples (c)
 James Topping
 Paul Wallace
 Richard Wallace
 Keith Wood (c)*

*captain in the first game

Scotland

Head coach: Jim Telfer

 Gary Armstrong
 Steve Brotherstone
 Craig Chalmers
 Damian Cronin
 Graham Ellis
 Ronnie Eriksson
 Cameron Glasgow
 Scott Hastings
 David Hilton
 Duncan Hodge
 Kenny Logan
 Shade Munro
 Bryan Redpath
 Andy Reed
 Rowen Shepherd
 Ian Smith
 Tom Smith
 Tony Stanger
 Derek Stark
 Mattie Stewart
 Alan Tait
 Gregor Townsend
 Rob Wainwright (c)
 Murray Wallace
 Peter Walton
 Doddie Weir

Wales

Head coach: Kevin Bowring

 Allan Bateman
 Colin Charvis
 Jonathan Davies
 Nigel Davies
 Ieuan Evans
 Scott Gibbs
 Simon Hill
 Rob Howley
 Jonathan Humphreys (c)
 Dafydd James
 Garin Jenkins
 Neil Jenkins
 Paul John
 Spencer John
 Gwyn Jones
 Kingsley Jones
 Gareth Llewellyn
 Christian Loader
 Dale McIntosh
 Lyndon Mustoe
 Wayne Proctor
 Craig Quinnell
 Scott Quinnell
 Mark Rowley
 Arwel Thomas
 Gareth Thomas
 Mike Voyle
 Steve Williams
 David Young

External links

Six Nations Championship squads